In mathematical logic, Heyting arithmetic  is an axiomatization of arithmetic in accordance with the philosophy of intuitionism.  It is named after Arend Heyting, who first proposed it.

Axiomatization
As with first-order Peano arithmetic , the intended model of this theory are the natural numbers  and the theories characterize addition and multiplication. Heyting arithmetic adopts the axioms of Peano arithmetic, including the signature with zero "" and the successor "", but uses intuitionistic logic for inference. In particular, the principle of the excluded middle  does not hold in general.

Metalogic and theorems
As with other theories over intuitionistic logic, various instances of  can be proven. For instance,  proves equality "" is decidable for all numbers,

Through the induction axiom, infinitely many non-trivial statement instances can be derived. For recursive ,

So, roughly speaking, the simple statements about computable functions provable in the classical arithmetic theory are already provable in the constructive one. 

That is to say, all Peano arithmetic theorems have a proof that consists of a constructive proof followed by a classical logical rewriting.

Insights into Hilbert's tenth problem provide a classically trivially provable mathematical statement that, in the direct formulation below, is not provable constructively. The resolution of Hilbert's question states that there is a polynomial  and a corresponding polynomial equation such that it is computably undecidable whether the latter has a solution. Decidability may be expressed as the excluded middle statement for the proposition .

Consistency
Kurt Gödel introduced the above negative translation and proved that if Heyting arithmetic is consistent, then so is Peano arithmetic.

However, Gödel's incompleteness theorems also applies to Heyting arithmetic.

Indeed, the search for an inconsistency of those theories can be formalized in Peano arithmetic. As established by Gödel, if the theory is consistent, then there is no proof in  that this search does halt (succeed), nor is there a proof in  that this search does not halt.

Anti-classical extensions
Relatedly, there are predicates  such that the theory  is consistent, where  is

With a constructive reading of a disjunction, this is an internal version of the claim that the predicate  is not decidable. 

Church's rule is an admissible rule in Heyting arithmetic. This is because of the computable undecidability for the statement  defined as the diagonal of Kleene's T predicate (see halting problem), which Church's principle then also establishes in the above sense.

Models

Realizability
Kleene, a student of Church, introduced important realizability models of the theory.
In turn, his student Nels David Nelson established that all closed formulas (all variables bound) of Heyting arithmetic can be realized.
See also BHK interpretation.

They also established, informally expressed here, that if

This can be extended to any finite number of function arguments .

See disjunction and existence properties.

Markov's rule is an admissible rule in Heyting arithmetic. Typed versions of realizability have been introduced by Georg Kreisel. With it he demonstrated the independence of the classically valid Markov's principle for intuitionistic theories.

Set theory
There are constructive set theory models for full  and its intended semantics.
Specifically, those theories do not require , the full axiom of separation or set induction (let alone the axiom of regularity), nor general function spaces (let alone the full axiom of power set).

Meta-theoretically, the domain of that theory is as big as the class of its ordinals and essentially given through the class  of all sets that are in bijection with a natural . As an axiom this is called  and the other axioms are those related to set algebra and order: Union and Binary Intersection, which is tightly related to the Predicative Separation schema, Extensionality, Pairing, and the Set induction schema. This theory is then already identical with the theory given by  without Strong Infinity and with the finitude axiom added. And in the other direction, the set theoretical axioms are proven with respect to the primitive recursive relation

That small universe of sets can be understood as the ordered collection of finite binary sequences which encode their mutual membership. For example, the 'th set contains one other set and the 'th set contains four other sets. See BIT predicate.

The standard model of the classical first-order theory  as well as any of its non-standard models is also a model for Heyting arithmetic .

Type theory
Type theoretical realizations mirroring inference rules based logic formalizations have been implemented in various languages.

Extensions
Many typed extensions of  have been extensively studied in proof theory, e.g. with function types.

Early on, variants with intensional equality and Brouwerian choice sequence have been investigated.

History
Formal axiomatization of the theory trace back to Heyting (1930), Herbrand and Kleene. 
Gödel proved the consistency result concerning  in 1933.

Related concepts
Heyting arithmetic should not be confused with Heyting algebras, which are the intuitionistic analogue of Boolean algebras.

See also
BHK interpretation
Constructive analysis
Constructive set theory
Harrop formula
Realizability

References

Ulrich Kohlenbach (2008), Applied proof theory, Springer.
Anne S. Troelstra, ed. (1973), Metamathematical investigation of intuitionistic arithmetic and analysis, Springer, 1973.

External links
Stanford Encyclopedia of Philosophy: "Intuitionistic Number Theory" by Joan Moschovakis.
Fragments of Heyting Arithmetic by Wolfgang Burr

Constructivism (mathematics)
Formal theories of arithmetic
Intuitionism